Allium macrostemon (野蒜, ノビル), Chinese garlic, Japanese garlic or long-stamen onion, is a species of wild onion widespread across much of East Asia. It is known from many parts of China, as well as Japan (incl Ryukyu Islands), Korea, Mongolia, Tibet and Primorye. It  has been collected from elevations ranging from sea level to 3000 m.

Allium macrostemon produces one round bulb up to 2 cm in diameter. Scape is up to 70 cm tall. Leaves are shorter than the scape, long and hollow, round or triangular in cross-section. Umbel is large and crowded with many pale red or pale purple flowers.

Allium macrostemon is mentioned in Huangdi Neijing as one of the five consumable herbs (五菜) which included mallow (Malva verticillata) (葵), pea leaves (藿), Welsh onion (蔥) and garlic chives (韭).

References

External links
 

macrostemon
Onions
Flora of Manchuria
Flora of China
Flora of Eastern Asia
Flora of the Russian Far East
Plants described in 1833
Taxa named by Alexander von Bunge